The 1932 football season was São Paulo's 3rd season since the club's founding in 1930.

Overall
{| class="wikitable"
|-
|Games played || 17 (11 Campeonato Paulista, 6 Friendly match)
|-
|Games won ||  13 (8 Campeonato Paulista, 4 Friendly match)
|-
|Games drawn ||  2 (1 Campeonato Paulista, 1 Friendly match)
|-
|Games lost ||  3 (2 Campeonato Paulista, 1 Friendly match)
|-
|Goals scored || 56
|-
|Goals conceded || 24
|-
|Goal difference || +32
|-
|Best result || 11–0 (H) v Internacional - Campeonato Paulista - 1932.7.13
|-
|Worst result || 2–4 (A) v Vasco da Gama - Friendly match - 1932.4.12
|-
|Top scorer ||

Friendlies

Official competitions

Campeonato Paulista

Record

External links
official website 

Association football clubs 1932 season
1932
1932 in Brazilian football